Pirapetinga is a municipality in the state of Minas Gerais in the Southeast region of Brazil.
Its estimated population in 2020 was 10,772 inhabitants (IBGE).

Geography

The municipality is located in the Meso-region of Zona da Mata near the border with the State of Rio de Janeiro. It has an area of  including the city itself and two districts: Valão Quente and Caiapó.

Topography, climate, hydrology

The district is watered by the River Pirapetinga a tributary of the Paraíba do Sul.

Highways

BR-393

Demographics

Census Data - 2000

Total Population : 10,034

Urban: 8413
Rural: 1621
Men: 5034
Women: 5000

(Source: AMM )

Population density (inhabitants / km2): 51.8

Infant mortality (per thousand): 25.4

Life expectancy (years): 71.1

Fertility rate (children per woman): 2.2

Literacy Rate: 83.8%

Human Development Index (HDI): 0.759

HDI-M Income: 0.681
HDI-M Longevity: 0.768
HDI-M Education: 0.827

(Source: UNDP / 2000)

History

The city began as a village that grew up around the chapel erected in honour of Saint Anne in 1850.  In 1864 the village became a district of Leopoldina with the name of Santana Pirapetinga.

It became independent of the municipality of Além Paraíba in 1938.

See also
List of municipalities in Minas Gerais

References

Municipalities in Minas Gerais